"Dream Lover" is a 1959 song by Bobby Darin.

Dream Lover(s) may also refer to:

Film, television, and theater 
 Dream Lover (1986 film), an American thriller directed by Alan J. Pakula
 Dream Lover (1993 film), an American erotic thriller directed by Nicholas Kazan
 Dream Lover (1995 film), a Hong Kong film co-produced by Sharla Cheung
 Dream Lovers, a 1986 Hong Kong film directed by Tony Au
 "Dream Lover" (Roseanne), a 1990 television episode
 "Dream Lover" (The Twilight Zone), a 2002 television episode
 "The Dream Lover" (The O.C.), a 2007 television episode
 Dream Lover: The Bobby Darin Musical, a 2016 Australian jukebox musical

Music

Performers and albums 
 Dreamlovers (band), a Belgian pop group
 The Dreamlovers, an American doo wop group
 Dreamlovers (album), by Tanya Tucker, 1980

Songs 
 "Dream Lover" (The Vaccines song), 2015
 "Dreamlover" (song), by Mariah Carey, 1993
 "Dreams" (The Cranberries song), 1992; covered as "Dream Lover" by Faye Wong, 1994
 "Dream Lover", written by Victor Schertzinger and Clifford Grey, 1929
 "Dream Lover", by the Marshall Tucker Band from Together Forever, 1978
 "Dream Lover", by the Jesus and Mary Chain from Munki, 1998

Other uses 
 The Dream Lover (short story collection), a 2008 book by William Boyd